Agustín Manuel de Eyzaguirre y Arechavala (May 3, 1768 – July 19, 1837) was a Chilean political figure. He served as Provisional President of Chile between 1826 and 1827.

Early life
He was born in Santiago, Chile, the son of the Basque Domingo Eyzaguirre Escutasolo and of María Rosa de Aretxabala y Alday.  He studied law and theology at the Real Universidad de San Felipe, graduating in 1789. Originally he wanted to become a priest, but later changed his mind, and decided to take over the family hacienda in Calera de Tango. He married María Teresa de Larraín y Guzmán Peralta on September 13, 1808. During all the rest of his life he dedicated himself to the commerce and the management of his lands.

Political career
During the first days of the revolt of Chile against Spanish domination in 1810 he was a member of the municipal corporation of Santiago, and joined the revolutionary cause with enthusiasm. He began his political career in 1812, when he was elected deputy to the first congress. When, in 1813, General José Miguel Carrera marched to meet the invasion of Brigadier Antonio Pareja, the senate appointed a temporary government, and Eyzaguirre was elected a member of the Junta de Gobierno established in March, 1813, along with José Miguel Infante and José Ignacio Cienfuegos, and which lasted until March 7, 1814.

He took an active part in founding the national academy and many schools, and in promulgating the liberty of the press; and during this administration the first republican paper was printed at Santiago. After the Battle of Rancagua, in October 1814, he, with other patriots, was imprisoned on the Island of Juan Fernandez, and all his property was confiscated. He returned after the Battle of Chacabuco, (February 12, 1817) that restored the exiles to their families.

During the presidency of Bernardo O'Higgins, Eyzaguirre retired to private life and devoted himself to his commercial interests. During this time he organized the famous Calcutta Company, for direct trade between Valparaíso and the East Indies, and thus was the first that caused the Chilean flag to float in Asiatic seas.

On January 28, 1823, he again became a member, together with José Miguel Infante y Rojas and Fernando Errázuriz Aldunate, of the ruling Government Junta that took over from the resigned Supreme Director Bernardo O'Higgins, and lasted until April 4, 1823, when Ramón Freire assumed as the new Supreme Director.

On July 8, 1826 Manuel Blanco Encalada was elected President, while he was elected Vice President. They took office on August 14, 1826. Upon the resignation of president Blanco Encalada, he assumed the office of president on September 11, 1826.

Administration 

His short government was marked by the financial difficulties that had caused the resignation of his predecessor. He found the treasury broke, with absolutely no sources of revenue since the complete administrative breakdown of the country prevented the government from collecting any taxes. There was no money to pay administrative personnel, and what was worse for the political situation of the time, the army was unpaid also.

Immediately upon his assuming office he had to deal first with some incidents in Chillán, and then with an insurrection in the island of Chiloé that was trying to break away from the control of the central government and return to the protection of Spain. The rebellion was very brutally suppressed, and 20 people were executed. The problems between the president and Congress that had marked the rule of his predecessor, continued. The federal laws started to cause friction between the new provinces, and the famous highwaymen the Pincheira family, started a new campaign.

Another problem was the bankruptcy of "Portales, Cea y Cía", the company in charge of the tobacco monopoly (and more importantly of the foreign debt service.) This bankruptcy became a big scandal, since the conservative opposition pointed out that the cause was the lack of legal security in a broken down country, while the government countermanded with the fact that the State would have to resume the payment of the foreign debt, when it was already bankrupt itself.

In the midst of this political bickering, colonel Enrique Campino, with the support of the radical federalist group, organized a military coup with the Santiago garrison, dissolving Congress and imprisoning some conservative ministers, chief among them Diego Portales and Manuel José Gandarillas. Finally the government managed to control the situation and imprison colonel Campino, but president Eyzaguirre had had enough. On January 25, 1827, he presented his resignation to Congress, which accepted it, and proceeded to name Ramón Freire as Presidente and Francisco Antonio Pinto as Vice President of Chile.

Cabinet

Later life
After this episode, Eyzaguirre retired from politics, and remained dedicated only to his hacienda until his death. He died in Santiago on July 19, 1837.

See also
Domingo Eyzaguirre
History of Chile

References

External links 

Short biography  
Genealogical chart of Eyzaguirre-Larraín family 

1768 births
1837 deaths
Presidents of Chile
Supreme Directors of Chile
Members of the Senate of Chile
Chilean people of Basque descent
People of the Chilean War of Independence
People from Santiago
Presidents of the Senate of Chile
Vice presidents of Chile